The Blériot four-engined bomber was a four-engined biplane designed and built in France during 1915. The four-engined bomber of 1915 was an enlarged version of the Bl 53 with four bay wings and four  Anzani 10A4 radial engines mounted on struts between the wings with fuel and oil tanks in the nacelles behind them.

References

Blériot aircraft
1910s French bomber aircraft
Biplanes